A common room is a type of shared lounge, most often found in halls of residence or dormitories, at (for example) universities, colleges, military bases, hospitals, rest homes, hostels, and even minimum-security prisons. They are generally connected to several private rooms,  and may incorporate a bathroom. They may also be found in secondary schools and sixth form colleges.

Regular features include couches, televisions, coffee tables, and other generic lounge furniture for socializing. Depending on its location and purpose of use, a common room may be known by another name. For instance, in mental hospitals, where access is usually restricted to the daytime hours, this type of room is often called a "day room".

In Singapore, the term usually refers to a bedroom without attached bathroom in an HDB apartment unit.

See also
 Common Room (university)
 Student lounge

References

External links 

Rooms
Educational environment
School terminology